Cyperus seslerioides is a species of sedge that is native to southern parts of North America, Central America and parts of South America.

The species was first formally described by the botanist Carl Sigismund Kunth in 1816.

See also
 List of Cyperus species

References

seslerioides
Plants described in 1816
Taxa named by Carl Sigismund Kunth
Flora of Argentina
Flora of Arizona
Flora of Bolivia
Flora of Costa Rica
Flora of Mexico
Flora of Guatemala
Flora of Honduras
Flora of Texas
Flora of Nicaragua
Flora of Peru
Flora of Venezuela